Alfred Berger (25 August 1894 – 11 June 1966) was an Austrian pair skater. With his skating partner, Helene Engelmann, he became the 1924 Olympic champion and a two-time world champion (1922, 1924).

Results
with Helene Engelmann

Navigation

1894 births
1966 deaths
Austrian male pair skaters
Olympic figure skaters of Austria
Figure skaters at the 1924 Winter Olympics
Olympic gold medalists for Austria
Olympic medalists in figure skating
World Figure Skating Championships medalists
Medalists at the 1924 Winter Olympics